Gulf Coast Council of the Boy Scouts of America serves over 5,000 youth in traditional Scouting and in Learning for Life programs 11 counties of the Florida panhandle and three counties in Alabama. The council service center is located in Pensacola, Florida. The council's name refers to the Gulf Coast of the United States.

History
Scouting was active in the area as early as 1909 through the YMCA, but the first council to serve a portion of the current council territory was the Pensacola Council chartered as a second class council in Pensacola in 1914. The council only lasted until 1916 and afterwards area troops were served by the BSA's Direct Service. In 1926 the Choctawhatchee Council (#726) out of Dothan, Alabama added Panama City, Florida Scouts. In 1927 the Satsumaland Council (#773) was formed and included three Florida and two Alabama counties. In 1930 the Alabama counties became part of the Mobile Area Council. In July 1934 seven additional Florida counties were moved the Satsumaland Council. In 1935 the Alabama counties were added back into the council's service area and the name was changed to the Gulf Coast Council. On January 30, 1935 a corporate charter was filed with the State of Florida.

Organization
The council is administratively divided into 4 districts:
 Alabama-Florida District
 Choctawhatchee District
 Pensacola Bay District
 Lake Sands District

Camps
In 1961, the Spanish Trail Scout Reservation (STSR) was founded in the Gulf Coast Council. STSR is one of the largest Scout reservations in the southeast. It offers a full range of facilities including: a  lake for swimming, canoeing, and fishing; a dining hall; and many places to camp. There are two camps on the STSR, Camp Euchee and Camp Jambo, each with full camping facilities.

Order of the Arrow
Yustaga Lodge #385 was founded in 1948 by Ted Childress and Norman Savellea. A chief and eleven braves from the Alibamu Lodge, Tukabatchee Area Council of Montgomery, Alabama came to the Gulf Coast Council’s Camp Big Heart on May 21–22, 1948 and inducted 24 new arrowmen. The Yustaga Lodge also has a wide variety of patches. Some of its lodge flaps and other patches can be seen here. The word Yustaga means the "Drinker of the Fire Water."

References

Local councils of the Boy Scouts of America
Southern Region (Boy Scouts of America)
Youth organizations based in Florida